Thomas Attix House is a historic home and farm complex located at Kenton, Kent County, Delaware.  The house was built in about 1880, and is a two-story, three bay, frame dwelling with a rear wing in a Gothic Revival / Queen Anne style.  Contributing outbuildings include a brick milk house, sawn-plank bull pen, frame barn, cattle sheds, and machine shed.  They date to the 19th and early-20th centuries.

It was listed on the National Register of Historic Places in 1983.

References

Farms on the National Register of Historic Places in Delaware
Gothic Revival architecture in Delaware
Queen Anne architecture in Delaware
Houses completed in 1880
Houses in Kent County, Delaware
Kenton, Delaware
National Register of Historic Places in Kent County, Delaware